The 30th Acrobatic Gymnastics European Championships is being held in Pesaro, Italy from September 29 to October 3, 2021. The competition is taking place in the Auditorium Scavolini.

Medal summary

Senior

Junior

Medal table

References

2021
Acrobatic European Championships
European Acrobatic Gymnastics Championship
International sports competitions hosted by Italy
European Acrobatic Gymnastics Championship
European Acrobatic Gymnastics Championship